The Children's Bookshow is an annual children's literature roadshow which visits theatres and schools across the United Kingdom in the autumn.

Established in 2003, The Children's Bookshow is directed by Siân Williams, and includes theatre performances by children's writers, workshops in schools, and competitions. The 2016 Children's Bookshow consisted of sixteen separate events, with authors from the UK and overseas, including Michael Rosen, Valerie Bloom and Fabio Geda.

In other years the tour has featured Judith Kerr, Quentin Blake, Kevin Crossley-Holland, Eva Ibbotson, Francesca Simon and Martin Waddell.

References

External links
 The Children's Bookshow

Literary festivals in the United Kingdom
Recurring events established in 2003
Festivals established in 2003